Robert More (fl. 1386) was an English politician.

More was a Member of Parliament for Dartmouth in 1386.

References

Year of birth missing
Year of death missing
14th-century births
English MPs 1386
Members of the Parliament of England for Dartmouth